Harry Blank  (born May 24, 1925) is a Canadian politician from Quebec and a seven-term member of the National Assembly of Quebec.

Early background
Blank is Jewish.  He was born on May 24, 1925 in Montreal, Quebec and was the son of Udel Blank and Molly Zinman.  He served in the Canadian Army during World War II, serving during the waning months of the war in Europe.  He attended college at McGill University and was admitted to the Bar of Quebec in 1950.

Political career
In the 1960 election, Blank ran as a Liberal candidate in the provincial district of Montréal–Saint-Louis.  Even though the Liberal vote was divided between his supporters and those of incumbent Dave Rochon, he narrowly won the election.  He was easily re-elected in 1962; and in the district of Saint-Louis he was re-elected in the 1966, 1970, 1973, 1976 and 1981 elections.  He was appointed Deputy Vice President of the National Assembly in 1971 and was Vice President (Deputy Speaker) of that institution from 1973 until 1976.

Decline
In the 1985 election, Official Opposition Leader Robert Bourassa prevented Blank from running as a Liberal candidate and offered the nomination to star candidate Jacques Chagnon.

Blank refused to retire from politics and ran as an Independent candidate.  He received 20% of the vote and finished third behind Chagnon, who won the election, and the Parti Québécois candidate.

Retirement
After his defeat, Blank returned to law practice.  He had been named Queen's Counsel in 1971. He still resides in Montreal.

See also
Politics of Quebec
Quebec general elections
Quebec Liberal Party

Footnotes

1925 births
Anglophone Quebec people
Jewish Canadian politicians
Lawyers from Montreal
Living people
McGill University alumni
Politicians from Montreal
Quebec Liberal Party MNAs
Canadian King's Counsel
Vice Presidents of the National Assembly of Quebec
Canadian Army personnel of World War II
20th-century Canadian lawyers